Grant Gondrezick (January 19, 1963 – January 7, 2021) was an American professional basketball player who took the court as a shooting guard.

Basketball career
After attending high school in his hometown, 6'5" Gondrezick played college basketball at Pepperdine University in the mid-1980s. He led the team in scoring during the 1983–84 season with a 13.7 points per game average, and was redshirted in the following year.

In 1986, Gondrezick was drafted by the Phoenix Suns with the 77th pick of the NBA Draft. He spent two seasons in the National Basketball Association, one apiece with the Suns and Los Angeles Clippers, averaging five points, two rebounds and one assist per game.

Personal life
Gondrezick was married to Lisa Harvey and had three children, WNBA player Kysre Gondrezick, Kalabrya Gondrezick, and Grant Gondrezick Jr. 

Gondrezick's older brother, Glen, was also a professional basketball player, and a shooting guard. He played six years in the NBA, dying in 2009 at the age of 53 due to heart failure.

On January 8, 2021, it was announced that Gondrezick had died suddenly the night before at the age of 57.

References

External links
Stats at Basketball-Reference

1963 births
2021 deaths
Albany Patroons players
American expatriate basketball people in Argentina
American expatriate basketball people in Belgium
American expatriate basketball people in France
American expatriate basketball people in Italy
American men's basketball players
Basketball players from Colorado
CB Valladolid players
La Crosse Catbirds players
Liga ACB players
Los Angeles Clippers players
Pepperdine Waves men's basketball players
Phoenix Suns draft picks
Phoenix Suns players
Rapid City Thrillers players
Shooting guards
Sportspeople from Boulder, Colorado